The UPS Store (formerly Mail Boxes Etc.)  is a subsidiary of United Parcel Service which provides, according to its website, shipping, shredding, printing, fax, passport photos, personal and business mailboxes, and notary services.

History 
In March 2001, UPS acquired Mail Boxes Etc., which was founded in 1980 as an alternative to the post office. In February 2003, UPS rebranded more than 3,000 Mail Boxes Etc. locations as The UPS Store. Each location is independently owned.

Services 
The UPS Store offers shipping, packaging, printing, shredding, notary services and postal services for individual consumers and small businesses. Franchise locations are typically found on or near military bases, hotels, colleges, shopping centers and convention centers.  there was 5,268 UPS Store locations across the United States and Canada.

Each UPS Store also serves as an access point for UPS shipping where customers can drop off packages with prepaid labels, as well as pack and ship new shipments.

The UPS Store's other major industry is printing. The store offers brochures, door hangers, car magnets, flyers, yard signs, menus for restaurants, manuals, and 3D printing.

Franchises 
The UPS Store is the world's largest franchisor of retail shipping, posting, printing, and business service centers. The initial UPS Store Franchise Fee is $29,950. You have to pay this upfront fee when opening a UPS Store franchise. The fee, however, reduces to 19,950 for second and subsequent franchised locations. For “Underserved Groups,” the fee reduces to $14,950. The estimated total investment necessary to begin the operation of a UPS Store Franchise ranges from $240,959 to $508,472. The following costs are part of the upfront costs included in the initial investment for a UPS Store. Many of these are one-time fees that are needed to launch the franchise. Investors who are veterans receive the additional benefit of $10,000 off the initial franchise fee, along with 50% off the application fee. The royalty fee for a UPS franchise is 5%, while the ad royalty is 2.5%. UPS offers two financing options for investors — in-house financing, which covers start-up cost, equipment, and inventory and third party financing. The UPS store has relationships with outside sources that offer financing which covers the franchise fee, start-up costs, equipment, and inventory.

Awards 
In 2019 and 2020, The UPS Store was ranked fifth overall among the top franchise brands in Entrepreneur Magazine’s Franchise 500 list. The company ranked third on the Franchise 500 list in 2021.

References

External links 

 upsers login

Companies based in San Diego
American companies established in 1980
Retail companies established in 1980
American companies established in 2003
Retail companies established in 2003
Store
Printing companies of the United States